Emanuel is a given name or last name originating from the Hebrew given name Immanuel.

It may refer to:
 Maximilian II Emanuel, Elector of Bavaria (1662–1726)
 Emanuel Cvjetićanin (1833–1919), general
 Emanuel Ginóbili, better known as Manu Ginóbili (born 1977), Argentine basketball player
 Emanuel R. Gold (1935–2013), New York politician
 Emanuel Hall (born 1997), American football player
 Emanuel Libman (1872–1946), American physician
 Emanuel Newton (born 1984), American mixed martial artist
 Emanuel Öz (born 1979), Swedish politician
 Emanuel Pogatetz (born 1983), Austrian football defender
 Emanuel Rackman (1910–2008), American Modern Orthodox rabbi; President of Bar-Ilan University
 Emanuel Rego, Beach volley player, Olympic gold medalist
 Emanuel Rodriguez (born 1986), Mexican-American professional wrestler
 Emanuel Schafer, German SS officer
 Emanuel Swedenborg (1688–1772), Swedish scientist, philosopher, and theologian
 Ari Emanuel (born 1961), American talent agent, brother of Ezekiel and Rahm
 David Emanuel (Governor of Georgia) (1744–1808), 24th Governor of Georgia, USA
 Ezekiel Emanuel (born 1957), American bioethicist, brother of Ari and Rahm
 James Emanuel (1921–2013), American poet and scholar
 Kent Emanuel (born 1992), American baseball player
 Kerry Emanuel, born 1955, American climate scientist
 Lee Emanuel (born 1985), British middle-distance runner
 Rahm Emanuel (born 1959), American politician and current mayor of Chicago, brother of Ari and Ezekiel
 Tom Emanuel  (1915–1997), Welsh footballer
 Emanuel Lasker (1868-1941), German chess player, mathematician, and philosopher

See also
 Emmanuel (name)

English masculine given names
Spanish masculine given names
Theophoric names